KLGV-LD, virtual and UHF digital channel 36, is a low-powered TBN-affiliated television station licensed to Longview, Texas, United States. Founded in 1992, KLGV-LD is owned by the International Broadcasting Network.

External links

LGV-LD
Television channels and stations established in 1992
Low-power television stations in the United States